Methylchloroisothiazolinone, also referred to as MCI, is the organic compound with the formula S(C2HCl)C(O)N(CH3). It is a white solid that melts near room temperature. The compound is an isothiazolinone, a class of heterocycles used as biocides. These compounds have an active sulphur moiety that is able to oxidize thiol-containing residues, thereby effectively killing most aerobic and anaerobic bacteria. MCI is often used in combination with methylisothiazolinone, a mixture known as Kathon. The isothiazolinones have attracted attention because they can cause contact dermatitis. Methylchloroisothiazolinone is effective against gram-positive and gram-negative bacteria, yeast, and fungi.

Application 
Methylchloroisothiazolinone is found in many water-based personal care products and cosmetics. Methylchloroisothiazolinone was first used in cosmetics in the 1970s. It is also used in glue production, detergents, paints, fuels, and other industrial processes. Methylchloroisothiazolinone is known by the registered tradename Kathon CG when used in combination with methylisothiazolinone.

Methylchloroisothiazolinone may be used in combination with other preservatives including ethylparaben, benzalkonium chloride, bronopol and phenoxyethanol.

Hazards 
Methylchloroisothiazolinone can cause allergic reactions in some people. The first publication of the preservative as a contact allergen was in 1988. Cases of photoaggravated allergic contact dermatitis, i.e. worsening of skin lesions after sun exposure, have also been reported.

In pure form or in high concentrations, methylchloroisothiazolinone is a skin and membrane irritant and causes chemical burns. In the United States, maximum authorized concentrations are 15 ppm in rinse-offs (of a mixture in the ratio 3:1 of 5-chloro-2-methylisothiazol 3(2H)-one and 2-methylisothiazol-3 (2H)-one). In Canada, methylchloroisothiazolinone may only be used in rinse-off products in combination with methylisothiazolinone, the total concentration of the combination may not exceed 15 ppm.

References

External links 
 CMIT/MIT Assessment
 
 Methylchloroisothiazolinone at the National Library of Medicine

Preservatives
Isothiazolidinones
Chloroarenes